Torre Eurosky (or Eurosky Tower) is a skyscraper in Rome, Italy. It is the tallest building in Rome and one of the highest residential towers in Italy.

Description
Designed by architect Franco Purini, and located in Torrino, residential area adjacent to the EUR, Torre Eurosky is inspired by the medieval towers that dot the center of the city—foremost among which is the Torre delle Milizie.

See also 
 List of tallest buildings in Rome

References 

 
 

Skyscrapers in Rome
Residential buildings completed in 2012
Residential skyscrapers in Italy
Skyscraper office buildings in Italy